Lewisham Town Hall is a municipal building in Catford Road, Lewisham, London. The oldest part of the facility, the curved municipal offices, which is the headquarters of Lewisham London Borough Council, is a Grade II listed building.

History
The building has its origins in a local vestry hall commissioned for the benefit of the Parish of St Laurence. The foundation stone for the vestry hall was laid by the Chairman of the Board of Works, James Brooker, on 27 July 1874. The vestry hall was designed by George Elkington in the Gothic style, completed in 1875 and was extended to accommodate the headquarters of the new Metropolitan Borough of Lewisham in 1901.

In the late 1920s civic leaders considered that additional facilities were needed accommodate the work of the borough. They resolved to create a curved structure, designed by Bradshaw Gass & Hope in the Art Deco style, incorporating a concert hall, to the east of the vestry hall. The construction work, which was carried out by G. E. Wallis & Sons began in May 1930. The design involved a symmetrical main frontage with 23 bays facing onto Rushey Green; the central section of four bays featured a doorway with canopy above on the ground floor; there were a series of tall windows interspersed with pilasters on the first and second floors and a series of smaller triple-arched windows on the third floor; an octagonal cupola with weather vane was erected on the roof. This structure, referred to as the "town hall extension" was officially opened by the Duke of York on 22 June 1932.

During the Second World War, an inquiry into the circumstances surrounding the bombing of Sandhurst Road School by enemy aircraft on 20 January 1943, which resulted in deaths of 38 children and 6 staff, was held in the town hall.

A further extension in the form of a long curved block of offices to the north west was designed by M. H. Forward in the Modernist style and built in the late 1950s and early 1960s. The complex continued to be headquarters of the Metropolitan Borough of Lewisham for much of the 20th century and continued to be the local seat of government after the enlarged London Borough of Lewisham in 1965.

A local activist, 13-year-old William Norton, had led a petition which was supported by John Betjeman to save the original vestry hall in August 1961. However, the new civic leaders insisted that the vestry hall had to be demolished in 1968 to make way for a "Civic Suite" which was designed by A Sutton and completed in November 1971. Meanwhile, on the south side of Catford Road, St Laurence's Church was also demolished in 1968 to make way for an additional office block for council use known as St Laurence's House. A statue by Gerda Rubinstein entitled Pensive Girl was unveiled outside the building in 1992.

Protesters forced themselves into the town hall during demonstrations against council spending reductions in November 2010.

Gallery

References

Grade II listed buildings in the London Borough of Lewisham
City and town halls in London
Government buildings completed in 1932
Grade II listed government buildings